This is a list of people elected Fellow of the Royal Society in 1932.

Fellows 

Sir Frederic Charles Bartlett
Davidson Black
Frederick William Carter
William George Fearnsides
Felix Eugen Fritsch
Joseph Alexander Gray
John Burdon Sanderson Haldane
Douglas Rayner Hartree
Heinrich Ernst Karl Jordan
Frederick Robert Miller
Sir Basil Mott
Sir John Lionel Simonsen
Thomas Smith
Sir Hugh Stott Taylor
Herbert Westren Turnbull
Warrington Yorke

Foreign members
Jacques Hadamard
Graham Lusk
Hermann Walther Nernst
Theobald Smith

Statute 12 Fellow 

Sir Henry Wellcome

1932
1932 in science
1932 in the United Kingdom